Arcantiodelphys is an extinct genus of basal Metatheria which existed in France during the Cenomanian age. It was first named by Romain Vullo, Emmanuel Gheerbrant, Christian de Muizon and Didier Néraudeau in 2009 and the type species is Arcantiodelphys marchandi.

Phylogeny 
Cladogram after Vullo et al. (2009).

References

Prehistoric metatherians
Fossil taxa described in 2009
Transitional fossils
Fossils of France
Cretaceous mammals of Europe
Prehistoric mammal genera